Evia may refer to:

People
 E.via, South Korean rapper
 Edgar de Evia (1910–2003), Mexican-born American photographer

Places
 Euboea, or Evvia, an island of Greece
 Iŭje, Belarus

Other uses
 Evia (moth), a genus of moth
 Evia Lifestyle Center, a shopping mall in the Philippines
 Evia Oyj, a Finnish marketing communication agency